Long Phuri, or Long Phuri Naga (Amimi Naga, Longpfuri, Longpfuru, Mimi), is an unclassified Naga language of Burma. It is not close to other Naga languages which it has been compared to, though Long Phuri Naga, Makuri Naga, and Para Naga may be closest to each other. Hsiu (2021) classifies Long Phuri as a sister of the Central Naga (Ao) languages.

Long Phuri is spoken in 6 villages of Leshi Township, Hkamti District, Sagaing Region, Myanmar.

References

Barkman, Tiffany. 2014. A descriptive grammar of Jejara (Para Naga). MA thesis, Chiang Mai: Payap University.
Language and Social Development Organization (LSDO). 2006. A sociolinguistic survey of Makuri, Para, and Long Phuri Naga in Layshi Township, Myanmar. Unpublished manuscript.

Languages of Myanmar
Kuki-Chin–Naga languages